Cynaeda gigantea is a species of moth in the family Crambidae. It is found in France, Switzerland, Croatia, Bosnia and Herzegovina, Hungary, Romania, the Republic of Macedonia, Greece and Turkey.

The larvae feed Anchusa and Onosma species. They mine the leaves of their host plant. The mine has the form of a large, inflated blotch. The frass is deposited in a central mass. Pupation takes place within the mine in a cocoon in the frass clump.

References

Moths described in 1871
Odontiini
Moths of Europe
Moths of Asia